Zanthoxylum holtzianum is a species of plant in the family Rutaceae. It is endemic to Tanzania.

References

Flora of Tanzania
holtzianum
Vulnerable plants
Taxonomy articles created by Polbot